Juliya may refer to:
 Juliya Chernetsky (born 1982), American television personality
 Juliya (film), a 2009 Sri Lankan Sinhala comedy film

See also
 Yulia, a female given name
 Julia, a female given name